Schausiana is a monotypic moth genus of the family Hepialidae described by Pierre Viette in 1950. The only described species is Schausiana trojesa, described by William Schaus in 1901, which is endemic to Mexico.

The wingspan is about 70 mm. The forewings are grey, covered with minute black striae edged with light brown. The hindwings are greyish brown with light brown hairs at the base. Some of the veins on the outer margin are light brown.

References

External links
Hepialidae genera

Hepialidae
Endemic Lepidoptera of Mexico
Monotypic moth genera
Taxa named by Pierre Viette
Exoporia genera